Jack Atkinson may refer to:

 Jack Atkinson (English footballer) (1913–1977)
 Jack Atkinson (Australian footballer) (born 1928), Australian rules footballer